Hunteracarus is a genus of mites in the family Laelapidae.

Species
 Hunteracarus womersleyi Costa, 1975

References

Laelapidae